Wolsit was an Italian professional cycling team that existed in part between 1910 and 1938. Its main sponsor was Italian bicycle manufacturer Wolsit. The team had two riders that won the general classification of the Giro d'Italia, Alfredo Binda in 1928 and Antonio Pesenti in 1932.

References

Cycling teams based in Italy
Defunct cycling teams based in Italy
1910 establishments in Italy
1938 disestablishments in Italy
Cycling teams established in 1910
Cycling teams disestablished in 1938